The New Zealand cricket team toured Australia from 23 October to 1 December 2015 to play three Test matches and four tour matches. The third match of the series at the Adelaide Oval was the first ever day-night Test. Michael Hussey captained the Prime Minister's XI side for the tour match, and in preparation for the day-night Test, a pink ball was used in this game. Australia won the series 2–0, with victories in Brisbane and Adelaide, with the second Test in Perth being drawn.

Following the conclusion of the Adelaide Test, New Zealand captain Brendon McCullum said that day-night Test cricket is "here to stay" and that "it's a great concept". The Australian captain Steve Smith also had praise for the day-night Test saying that "the whole Test match was a great innovation, it was a great spectacle". Media reaction to the first day-night Test was also positive, with many news outlets praising the innovation. However, following the match the majority of players who took part in the game said that there needs considerable work on floodlit Test cricket. Twenty of the twenty-two players who responded supported the concept of day-night Test cricket but work on the pink ball needed further refinement.

Squads

All-rounder Corey Anderson was ruled out of New Zealand's Test series in Australia because of an ongoing back problem. Anderson was replaced by the uncapped Mitchell Santner for the Test series. Neil Wagner was added to New Zealand's squad after Tim Southee suffered a back injury during the first Test. James Neesham was ruled out of the rest of the series after injuring his back in the first Test. He was replaced by Mitchell McClenaghan. Before the inaugural day/night Test in Adelaide, Shaun Marsh replaced Usman Khawaja and James Pattinson replaced the retired Mitchell Johnson. Stephen O'Keefe was released the day of the Test after the pitch condition was inspected. Mitchell Starc suffered a stress fracture to his right foot during the first day of the Adelaide Test and was ruled out of bowling for the rest of the match.

Tour matches

Prime Minister's XI v New Zealanders

Cricket Australia XI v New Zealanders

First-class match: Cricket Australia XI v New Zealanders

The match was abandoned after the Cricket Australia XI's declaration shortly before lunch on Day 2 due to an unsafe pitch. The New Zealanders had become concerned about the state of the pitch after some dangerously high bouncing deliveries late on Day 1; the match continued on the morning of Day 2 with the New Zealanders bowling only its spinners, the Cricket Australia XI declared immediately after Ryan Carters' dismissal, and the match was not resumed.

Western Australia XI v New Zealanders

Test series (Trans-Tasman Trophy)

1st Test

The first Test of the series resulted in a dominant Australian victory. After winning the toss, Australia on back of centuries from David Warner and Usman Khawaja and half centuries from Joe Burns and Adam Voges declared their innings at 4/556. New Zealand in reply had a steady start before a middle-order collapse left them struggling at the end of day 2. However, Kane Williamson's 140 meant that Australia didn't enforce the follow-on. However, Warner's second century and Burns maiden ton resulted in New Zealand being set a target of 504 runs. Another middle-order collapse meant that despite rain interruptions on day 3 and day 4 Australia comfortably won the Test by 208 runs.

2nd Test

3rd Test

References

External links
 Series home at ESPN Cricinfo

2015 in Australian cricket
2015 in New Zealand cricket
International cricket competitions in 2015–16
New Zealand cricket tours of Australia
2015–16 Australian cricket season